Chopin (also recorded as Chotin) is an unincorporated community in Natchitoches Parish, Louisiana, United States. It was named after Kate Chopin an author of short stories.

The community is part of the Natchitoches Micropolitan Statistical Area.

References 

Unincorporated communities in Natchitoches Parish, Louisiana
Unincorporated communities in Louisiana
Populated places in Ark-La-Tex